Mahatma Gandhi Mission's College of Engineering and Technology (MGMCET) is one of the chain of educational institutions set up by the Mahatma Gandhi Mission, a Charitable Trust Act 1950 and Societies Regulation Act 1860. It was founded in 1982 and is situated in Kamothe, Navi Mumbai, India.
The college is affiliated to the University of Mumbai and approved by AICTE, New Delhi.

MGM is a chain of engineering, medical, nursing, management, dental, physiotherapy, science, journalism, and fine arts schools spread over four educational centers in Navi Mumbai, Nanded, Aurangabad, and Noida.

The college provides hostel facilities and bus services to its students. It is one of the oldest colleges in Navi Mumbai. 
The college also has a ground for sports like cricket, volleyball, and football.

Departments 
 Information Technology
 Computer Engineering
 Electronics and Telecommunication Engineering
 Mechanical Engineering
 Civil Engineering
 Chemical Engineering
 Biotechnology Engineering
 Biomedical Engineering
 Electrical Engineering

Students' activities 

A collegiate club is affiliated to the Society of Automobile Engineers India. The students undertake various workshops and industrial visits giving them hands-on experience of the automobile industry. They also participate in various competitions organized by SAEINDIA. A team from the club, MGM Accellors, participated in SUPRA SAEINDA 2015, held at MMRT Chennai. The team secured a 36th overall rank.

The college fest is conducted around February and March. The theme for each year is different and is decided by the student body with the guidance of the faculty. Inter-departmental competitions are also an integral part of the fest.
Events organized during Fest: 
 Fun Arete: it is the annual cultural fest of MGMCET
 Action Arete: it is the annual spots fest of MGMCET
 Tech Arete: it is the annual technical fest of MGMCE

See also 
 List of colleges in Mumbai

References

External links 
 Official website of MGMCET

Education in Navi Mumbai